Solas Marine fast interceptor boats (FIC) are vessels being built for the Indian Navy by a shipyard located along the Hamilton Canal at Wattala, near Colombo, owned by Solas Marine Lanka (Pvt) Ltd. Solas Marine Lanka (Pvt) Ltd is part of Dubai-based Solas Marine Services Group.

Development history
The Indian ministry of defence (MOD) on 22 May 2009 sent out request for proposal (RfP) to 43 shipyards in India and other countries for 80 FICs. After the bids were submitted by the contenders, they were evaluated by the technical evaluation committee (TEC). Thereafter Sri Lankan shipyard Solas Marine was shortlisted for supply of the 80 boats. A deal worth  for the same was signed in the last week of September 2011. As per the agreement, the 80 boats were to be supplied in batches of 15 and the induction of first batch was to take place within 36 months from the signing of the contract.

Description
They have deep–vee chine hull form with sharp water entry to ensure a soft ride in adverse sea states. The Vacuum infusion process have been used to build hull, which ensure significant strength gains, intrinsic to the technology. The vessels have excellent sea-keeping and dynamic stability capability at high speed in sea state 3 and is sea worthy up to sea state 4. The craft's model has been tested at Wolfson, UK. The upper deck canopy of each vessel is bullet proof and has air conditioned crew area to meet all crew comfort and safety measures. They are also fitted with night vision devices, communication equipment, automatic identification system (AIS) and radar, besides carrying a Long Range Acoustic Device (LRAD), a sonic weapon used for scaring pirates away. The vessels carry a crew of 4 and can carry a variety of armament from Heavy Machine Guns to Grenade Launchers. They are intended for intercepting suspicious boats for inspection and verification.

Deployment
Out of 80 boats, 31 are based in Western Naval Command, 16 in Southern Naval Command, 33 in Eastern Naval Command. They are in services with navy's Sagar Prahari Bal for guarding naval assets and strategic installations from seaborne threats, harbour defence (primarily, protection of vessels inside the harbour area), and patrolling the seafront with state marine police forces.

Delivery
The FICs were to be delivered in batches, with each batch consisting of 04 FICs. As of January 2013, the first batch of FICs were undergoing trials in Sri Lanka. The delivery of the initial batch of FICs was scheduled for December 2012 and the following batch in April 2013. This was delayed at the manufacturer's end, pushing the delivery schedule by a few months. As of March 2013 first bath of four craft were delivered to southern command which were inducted by it on 20 March 2013 and Southern Naval Command was also scheduled to receive 12 more of these craft in the coming months. The FIC's were to be deployed in Ezhimala and in the islands of Kavaratti, Minicoy, and Androth.

As of 2017 all 20 batches have been delivered by the Shipyard with the last batch’s delivery on 28 Mar 17 against original schedule of 02 Apr 17.

See also
List of active Indian Navy ships

References

External links

Indian navy to acquire 80 interceptor boats from Sri Lanka
Navy to beef up surveillance with new interceptor craft
 Pics of Solas Marine Lanka Fast  Interception Craft for Indian Navy
Boats for Indian navy undergo sea trials off Colombo

Patrol vessels of the Indian Navy
Patrol boat classes
Ships built in India
Military boats
Maritime security of India